Essex Ferry was a  train ferry built in 1956 by John Brown & Company for British Railways. She served until 1981 when she was laid up. In 1983, she was reduced to a floating pontoon and used in the salvage of the semi-submersible drilling rig  before being scrapped later that year.

Description
Essex Ferry was built by John Brown & Company, Clydebank as yard number 694. She was powered by two 6-cylinder Sulzer single action diesel engines with cylinders of  stroke by  bore, rated at 2,680 bhp.

History
Essex Ferry was launched on 24 October 1955. She was allocated the Official Number 185600. Completed in January 1957, she made her maiden voyage from Harwich to Zeebrugge, Belgium on 15 January. With the introduction of IMO Numbers in the late 1960s, Essex Ferry was allocated the IMO Number 5106693. She could carry 38 railway wagons and had accommodation for twelve passengers. She mainly served on the Harwich to Zeebrugge route, with a short spell of service in May 1972 on the Holyhead to Dublin route. Towards the end of her service she was transferred to the Harwich - Dunkerque route.

Essex Ferry was withdrawn from service in 1981 and laid up at Harwich. In 1983, Essex Ferry was sold to Medway Secondary Metals for breaking, departing under tow for Rainham, Kent on 27 April 1983 and arriving two days later. She was initially reduced to deck level and renamed Essex Ferry Pontoon. She was used in the salvage of the Norwegian semi-submersible drilling rig  which had capsized in March 1980. Following this work, she was scrapped.

References

1955 ships
Train ferries
Merchant ships of the United Kingdom
Ferries of the United Kingdom
Ships of British Rail
Ships built on the River Clyde